Kabalapur (Bharmyanatti) is a village in Belgaum district in Karnataka, India.

Hallur

Villages in Belagavi district